Suren Rafiki Papikyan (born 26 April 1986) is an Armenian politician currently serving as the Minister of Defense of Armenia. He formerly served as minister of territorial administration and infrastructure and briefly as deputy prime minister. He is also chairman of the board of the ruling Civil Contract Party.

Biography 
Suren Papikyan was born on 26 April 1986, in the town of Stepanavan, now in the Lori Province of Armenia. He graduated from Stepanavan College No. 1 and was accepted to the Faculty of History of Yerevan State University in 2003. Papikyan was called up for service in the Armenian Armed Forces while attending university. While serving in the military, Papikyan was sentenced to two years and three months imprisonment, reportedly due to a violent incident with a commanding officer, but was released about a year later in a general amnesty. 

Papikyan received his master's degree in history with honors from Yerevan State University in 2012. Parallel to his studies, he worked as a history teacher at Yerevan High School No. 54 from 2010 to 2016 and from 2011 to 2018 at Quantum College in Yerevan. From 2012 to 2016 he conducted his postgraduate studies at Saint Petersburg State University.

Papikyan is a founding member of the Civil Contract Party. He was elected deputy chairman of the party board in 2016 and chairman of the board in 2019. 

Papikyan participated in the 2017 Armenian parliamentary elections as a candidate for the Way Out Alliance. Papikyan participated in the 2018 Armenian revolution which brought Nikol Pashinyan to power.

On 11 May 2018, Papikyan was appointed Minister of Territorial Administration and Development of Armenia in Nikol Pashinyan's first government.

During the 2018 snap parliamentary elections, he headed the campaign headquarters of the My Step bloc and was elected to parliament as a member of the same bloc. Papikyan resigned from parliament in January 2019. He was reappointed minister of territorial administration and infrastructure on 1 June 2019.

After briefly occupying the position of deputy prime minister, Papikyan was appointed Minister of Defense of Armenia on 15 November 2021. The day after his appointment, significant clashes occurred on the Armenian-Azerbaijani border, resulting in human and territorial losses for the Armenian side.

References 

Armenian politicians

21st-century Armenian historians

Defence ministers of Armenia

Living people

1986 births

Yerevan State University alumni

Saint Petersburg State University alumni
Civil Contract (Armenia) politicians